The Dueling Grounds Derby is a Grade III American Thoroughbred horse race for three years olds, over a distance of one and five-sixteenths miles on the turf held annually in September at Kentucky Downs racetrack in Franklin, Kentucky during their short turf meeting.  The event currently carries an offered purse of $750,000.

History

The name of the event reflects the original name of the track known as the Dueling Grounds Race Course located very close to the Kentucky-Tennessee border where numerous duels were held in the 1800s.  With the introduction of Instant Racing in 2011 the influx of revenue enabled the administration of the track to add new events.

The inaugural running of the event was on September 6, 2014, opening day of the five-day meeting at Kentucky Downs. A field of eight entrants lined up and the event was won by the James Lawrence II trained My Afleet who started at 8/1 defeating the favorite Medal Count who earlier in the year finish third in the Belmont Stakes by a nose in a time of 2:14.10. Later, My Afleet continued his career as a steeplechaser winning an event as a ten-year-old in 2021 at Willowdale in Pennsylvania and setting a new track record for the three-mile timber course.
 
With the influx of gaming revenue at Kentucky Downs the purse for the event has risen dramatically to nearly $750,000 offered by 2020.

From 2016 until 2019 the event was sponsored by the Lexington, Kentucky based Exacta Systems. Since 2021 Big Ass Fans also based in Lexington became the new sponsors of the event.

In 2022 the event was upgraded by the Thoroughbred Owners and Breeders Association to a Grade III and was to be held on September 4, but was moved to the next day, Labor Day.

Records 
Speed record:
 miles: 2:06.76  –  Moon Over Miami (2020)

Margins:
 length – Oscar Nominated (2016)

Most wins by an owner:
 No owner has won the event more than once

Most wins by a jockey:
 No jockey has won the event more than once

Most wins by a trainer:
2 – Todd A. Pletcher (2018, 2019)
2 – William I. Mott (2015, 2020)

Winners 

Legend:

See also
 List of American and Canadian Graded races

References

Kentucky Downs
Graded stakes races in the United States
Grade 3 stakes races in the United States
Recurring sporting events established in 2014
2014 establishments in Kentucky
Horse races in Kentucky
Turf races in the United States
Flat horse races for three-year-olds